Jiří Přívratský (born 13 March 2001) is a Czech sports shooter. He competed in the men's 10 metre air rifle event at the 2020 Summer Olympics.

References

External links
 

2001 births
Living people
Czech male sport shooters
Olympic shooters of the Czech Republic
Shooters at the 2020 Summer Olympics
Sportspeople from Ostrava